Cenobitic (or coenobitic) monasticism is a monastic tradition that stresses community life. Often in the West the community belongs to a religious order, and the life of the cenobitic monk is regulated by a religious rule, a collection of precepts. The older style of monasticism, to live as a hermit, is called eremitic. A third form of monasticism, found primarily in Eastern Christianity, is the skete.

The English words "cenobite" and "cenobitic" are derived, via Latin, from the Greek words koinos (κοινός), "common", and bios (βίος), "life".  The adjective can also be cenobiac (κοινοβιακός, koinobiakos) or
cœnobitic (obsolete).  A group of monks living in community is often referred to as a cenobium. Cenobitic monasticism appears in several religious traditions, though most commonly in Buddhism and Christianity.

Origins
The word cenobites was initially applied to the followers of Pythagoras in Crotona, Italy, who founded a commune not just for philosophical study but also for the "amicable sharing of worldly goods."

Judaic monasticism

In the 1st century AD, Philo of Alexandria (c. 25 BC – c. 50 AD) describes a Jewish ascetic community of men and women on the shores of Lake Mareotis in the vicinity of Alexandria, Egypt which he calls the Therapeutae. Members of the community lived apart from one another during six days of the week, studying the Hebrew Bible during the daytime and eating during the evening, whereafter on the Sabbath they hoped to dream visions informed by their studies. Members of the community composed books of midrash, an allegorical method of interpreting scripture. Only on the Sabbath would the Therapeutae meet, share their learning, eat a common, albeit simple, meal of bread and spring water, and listen to a lecture on the Torah given by one of the venerable members of the community. Every seventh Sabbath, or High Sabbath, was accorded a festival of learning and singing, which climaxed in an egalitarian dance.

The 3rd-century Christian writer Eusebius of Caesarea (c. 263–339), in his Ecclesiastical History, identified Philo's Therapeutae as the first Christian monks, identifying their renunciation of property, chastity, fasting, and solitary lives with the cenobitic ideal of the Christian monks.

Christian monasticism

The organized version of Christian cenobitic monasticism is commonly thought to have started in Egypt in the 4th century AD. Christian monks of previous centuries were usually hermits, especially in the Middle East; this continued to be very common until the decline of Aramean Christianity in the Late Middle Ages. This form of solitary living, however, did not suit everyone. Some monks found the eremitic style to be too lonely and difficult; and if one was not spiritually prepared, the life could lead to mental breakdowns.

For this reason, organized monastic communities were established so that monks could have more support in their spiritual struggle.  While eremitic monks did have an element of socializing, since they would meet once a week to pray together, cenobitic monks came together for common prayer on a more regular basis.  The cenobitic monks also practised more socializing because the monasteries where they lived were often located in or near inhabited villages.  For example, the Bohairic version of Dionysius Exiguus' The Life of Saint Pachomius states that the monks of the monastery of Tabenna built a church for the villagers of the nearby town of the same name even "before they constructed one for themselves."  This means that cenobitic monks did find themselves in contact with other people, including lay people, whereas the eremitic monks tried their best to keep to themselves, only meeting for prayer occasionally.

Saint Pachomius

Cenobitic monks were also different from their eremitic predecessors and counterparts in their actual living arrangements. Whereas the eremitic monks ("hermits") lived alone in a monastery consisting of merely a hut or cave ("cell"), the cenobitic monks ("cenobites") lived together in monasteries comprising one or a complex of several buildings. In the latter case, each dwelling would house about twenty monks, and within the house there were separate rooms or cells that would be inhabited by two or three monks. To early generations of historians, the style of housing maintained by cenobitic monks was attributed to the same man usually hailed the "father of cenobitic monasticism," St. Pachomius, who was believed to have found the idea for such quarters during the time he spent in the Roman army, as the style was "reminiscent of army barracks." While this impression may have been to some extent mythologized by the bishop and historian Palladius of Galatia,  communal barracks-like desert dwellings known as cenobia came to exist circa the early 4th century.

Though Pachomius is often credited as the "father of cenobitic monasticism," it is more accurate to think of him as the "father of organized cenobitic monasticism", as he was the first monk to take smaller communal groups that often already existed and bring them together into a larger federation of monasteries. He continued this work until his death in 347 at Pbow, a monastic center that he had founded some ten years before.

The account of how Pachomius was given the idea to start a cenobitic monastery is found in Palladius' Lausiac History, which says that an angel conveyed the idea to him. Though this is an interesting explanation of why he decided to initiate the cenobitic tradition, there are sources that indicate there were already other communal monastic communities around at that time and possibly before him. In fact, three of the nine monasteries that joined Pachomius' cenobitic federation were not founded by him, meaning he actually was not the first to have such an idea since these three "clearly had an independent origin."

Though he was not the first to implement communal monasticism, Pachomius is still an important part of cenobitic monastic history, since he was the first to bring separate monasteries together into a more organized structure. This is the reason why (as well as the fact that much hagiography and literature has been written about him) he has continued to be recognized as the father of the tradition.

Melitians and Manichaeans

Aside from the monasteries that joined Pachomius' federation of cenobitic monasteries, there were also other cenobitic groups, both Christian and non-Christian, who decided not to join him. The Melitians and the Manichaeans are examples of these cenobitic groups.

Even before Pachomius had started on his path toward monastic communities, the Melitians as a group were already recruiting members. The Melitians were a heretical Christian sect founded by Meletius of Lycopolis. Moreover, they had "heard of Pachomius' monastic aspirations and tried to recruit him" to join their community.

As for Manichaeans, members of a religion founded by a man named Mani, some scholars believe they were the "pioneers of communal asceticism in Egypt," and not Pachomius and the Pachomians as has become the common thought.  Mani, himself, was actually influenced to begin cenobitic monasticism from other groups, including Buddhists and Jewish-Christian Elkasites.

Later cenobitic communities
The cenobitic monastic idea did not end with these early groups, though, but rather inspired future groups and individuals:

Mar Awgin founded a monastery on Mt. Izla above Nisibis in Mesopotamia (~350), and from this monastery the cenobitic tradition spread in Mesopotamia, Persia, Armenia, Georgia and even India and China.
St. Basil of Caesarea founded a monastery at Annesi, Pontus (c.364) after witnessing the Egyptian monasteries. The Rule of St Basil would go on to become the standard monastic rule in the Eastern Orthodox Church.
Mar Saba organized the monks of the Judaean Desert in a monastery close to Bethlehem (483), and this is considered the mother of all monasteries of the Eastern Orthodox churches.
St. Benedict of Nursia founded the monastery of Monte Cassino in Italy (529), which was the seed of Roman Catholic monasticism in general, and of the order of Benedict in particular.
St. Bruno of Carthusia, prompted by the spectre of the damnation of the Good Doctor of Paris Cenodoxus, founded a monastery just outside Paris in the 11th century.

In both the East and the West, cenobiticism established itself as the primary form of monasticism, with many foundations being richly endowed by rulers and nobles. The excessive acquisition of wealth and property led to several attempts at reform, such as Bernard of Clairvaux in the West and Nilus of Sora in the East.

See also
Hermitage - eremitic monasticism
Intentional community
Lavra - early form of monasticism
Sheneset-Chenoboskion - place in Egypt with a monastery dedicated to St Pachomius
Skete - form of monastic community in Eastern Christianity

Notes

References

Attridge, H. W., & Hata, G.  “The Origins of Monasticism” in Ascetics, Society, and the Desert : Studies in Egyptian monasticism. Harrisburg, PA: Trinity Press International, 1999.
Dunn, Marilyn. The Emergence of Monasticism: From the Desert Fathers to the Early Middle Ages.  Malden, Mass.: Blackwell Publishers, 2000.
Goehring, James E. "Withdrawing from the Desert: Pachomius and the development of Village Monasticism in Upper Egypt." Harvard Theological Review 89(1996): 267–285.
Halsall, Paul. “Chapter XXXII: Pachomius and Tabennesiots” in Palladius: The Lausiac History. September 1998. Internet Medieval Sourcebook. 30 March 2007 <http://www.fordham.edu/halsall/basis/palladius-lausiac.html>.
Harmless, William. “Chapter 5: Pachomius” in Desert Christians - An Introduction to the Literature of Early Monasticism. New York: Oxford University Press, 2004.
Lawrence, C. H. “Chapter 1: The Call of the Desert” in Medieval Monasticism.  3rd edition.  Toronto: Pearson Education Limited, 2001.

External links

Christian monasteries
Asceticism
Christian terminology
Catholic orders and societies by type